Preston Wimberly is an American musician, singer, songwriter and guitarist known for being a member of Jamestown Revival and a former member of The Wild Feathers.

Career 
Preston Wimberly was raised in Dallas. He and fellow Wild Feathers member Taylor Burns attended Richardson High School in Richardson, Texas. In 2007, Wimberly and Taylor started blues band Noble Dog. Wimberly and Burns later went on to found country rock band The Wild Feathers in Nashville, Tennessee. The Wild Feathers were distinguished by their unique quadruple harmonic style, with four main vocalists. Like Wimberly, the other three vocalists in The Wild Feathers had previously been frontmen of their own bands before starting The Wild Feathers.

Wimberly recorded The Wild Feathers' self-titled 2013 album The Wild Feathers. He appeared in George Tillman Jr.'s 2015 film The Longest Ride. He officially left the band in 2015, after recording the album Lonely Is A Lifetime which was released in 2016. Wimberly has had a solo career as a guitarist, and performed with acts like The Way Down Wanderers and King Corduroy. He was feature on Statesboro Revue's album Ramble On Privilege Creek (2013).

In 2016, Wimberly joined Jamestown Revival as guitarist. Previously, Jamestown Revival had joined The Wild Feathers on their 2014 tour. I 2016 Wimberly performed at the Ryman Auditorium with The Wild Feathers' for their live album Live At The Ryman.

Discography

Jamestown Revival

The Wild Feathers

Filmography

References

External links 

American country rock musicians
American country rock singers
American country singer-songwriters
American country guitarists
Living people
Year of birth missing (living people)
Country musicians from Texas